Common Sky, formerly named MAPJet, is an Austrian aviation company headquartered in Linz that offers aircraft, crew, maintenance and insurance (ACMI) services as well as business jet charters.

History
In January 2010 MAPJet founded Austriair, a new scheduled airline based at Vienna International Airport which planned to operate with Bombardier Q400 and Embraer 195 aircraft leased from Augsburg Airways. The first planned routes would have led from Vienna to Munich and Frankfurt. In April 2010 however, they cancelled their scheduled operations project. One reason given was a lawsuit claim from Austrian Airlines due to possible trademark violations.

In 2012, MAPJet was rebranded and received its current name Common Sky.

Fleet

As of December 2017, the Common Sky fleet consists of the following aircraft:

 1 Bombardier Challenger 604
 1 Bombardier Challenger 850
 1 Cessna Citation Sovereign

References

External links

Official website

Airlines of Austria
Airlines established in 2002
Austrian companies established in 2002
Companies based in Linz
Economy of Upper Austria